Kevin Ronald Nicholson (born March 29, 1976) is a Canadian former professional baseball shortstop. He played part of the  season for the San Diego Padres of Major League Baseball, and for the Canadian Olympic baseball team in 2004.

Career
Nicholson was drafted by the California Angels in the 43rd round (1182nd overall) of the 1994 MLB draft, but did not sign, choosing instead to attend Stetson University, where he played college baseball under head coach Pete Dunn. In 1996, he played collegiate summer baseball with the Wareham Gatemen of the Cape Cod Baseball League, and was named the league's MVP. In 1997, he was named conference Player of the Year.

In the 1997 MLB draft he was chosen in the first round, 27th overall, by the San Diego Padres.

Nicholson spent three seasons in the minors, playing in 1998 and 1999 with the Class AA Mobile Bay Bears, and in 1999 had a batting average of .288 with 13 home runs and 81 RBIs. Nicholson played 37 games for the Padres in 2000. 

He later spent time in the Colorado Rockies, St. Louis Cardinals, and Pittsburgh Pirates organizations, but never saw action for their major league clubs.

He was a member of the Canadian national baseball team for several years. In 2001, he was with their Baseball World Cup team, and was a member of Team Canada's fourth place team in the 2004 Summer Olympics. He played for Canada at the inaugural World Baseball Classic in 2006, being the last season in which Nicholson played professionally, appearing with the Somerset Patriots of the independent Atlantic League. 

His final appearance for Team Canada came at the 2007 Baseball World Cup.

See also
List of Major League Baseball players from Canada

References

Sources

1976 births
Living people
Altoona Curve players
Arizona League Padres players
Baseball players at the 2004 Summer Olympics
Baseball people from British Columbia
Canadian expatriate baseball players in the United States
Colorado Springs Sky Sox players
Las Vegas Stars (baseball) players
Major League Baseball players from Canada
Major League Baseball shortstops
Memphis Redbirds players
Mobile BayBears players
New Haven Ravens players
Olympic baseball players of Canada
Portland Beavers players
Rancho Cucamonga Quakes players
San Diego Padres players
Somerset Patriots players
Sportspeople from Vancouver
Stetson Hatters baseball players
Wareham Gatemen players
World Baseball Classic players of Canada
2006 World Baseball Classic players